The Santa Teresa Formation (Tist, Pgst) is a geological formation of the western Eastern Ranges of the Colombian Andes, west of the Bituima Fault, and the southern Middle Magdalena Valley. The formation spreads across the western part of Cundinamarca and the northern portion of Tolima. The formation consists of grey claystones intercalated by orange quartz siltstones and sandstones of small to conglomeratic grain size. The thickness at its type section has been measured to be  and a maximum thickness of  suggested.

In the formation, dated on the basis of its fossil content to the Late Oligocene, many leaf imprints and mollusks were found, suggesting a lacustrine to deltaic depositional environment with periodical marine incursions.

Etymology 
The formation was defined by De Porta in 1966 and named after the vereda Santa Teresa, San Juan de Rioseco.

Description 

The Santa Teresa Formation is the youngest unit outcropping in the Jerusalén-Guaduas synclinal, western Eastern Ranges, covering the San Juan de Río Seco Formation. The formation was formerly called La Cira Formation.

The lower boundary of the formation is marked by the first occurrence of grey claystones, covering the light brown claystones of the San Juan de Río Seco Formation. The formation comprises grey claystones intercalated by orange quartz siltstones and sandstones of small to conglomeratic grain size. The roundness of the sandstone grains has been characterized as angular to subangular by Lamus Ochoa et al. in 2013. The claystones occur in thick layers with wavy lamination.

In these thick packages of claystones, the formation has provided fossil leaves in various forms and sizes, and to a lesser extent the remains of mollusks; gastropods and bivalves. The basal contacts of these beds are straight to transitional and most of the time are coarsening upward towards quartz arenites where the gastropods dominate. Locally, bioturbation, siderite nodules and coal beds occur in the formation. The sandstones occur in very thin to very thick beds, characterized by plain parallel lamination, in lenses and very locally in flasers. The cement of the arenites is calcareous. The grain composition of the lithic fraction comprises zircon, epidote, zoisite, clinozoisite and pyroxenes, which at the top of the formation amounts to 86 percent.

Stratigraphy and depositional environment 
The Santa Teresa Formation conformably overlies the San Juan de Río Seco Formation and is covered by subrecent alluvium. The formation is part of the sequence after the Eocene unconformity.

The age has been inferred to be Late Oligocene. The depositional environment has been interpreted as lacustrine with marine influence in the form of channels. The abundance of brackish and fresh water gastropods suggests these environmental conditions prevailed in the Oligocene of central Colombia.

In the type section at the Balú quebrada, facies traits that confirm this interpretation can be observed. The lacustrine areas were probably shallow water environments with reducing conditions and a continuous supply of siliciclastics by small deltas. The many leaf imprints and coal layers support the presence of a lush vegetation at the time of deposition. The abundance of lithic clasts near the top of the formation supports a renewed provenance area to the east; the uplift of the Eastern Ranges of the Colombian Andes, due to activity of the La Salina Fault.

Paleontology 
The Santa Teresa Formation has provided fossil mollusks, described by De Porta and Solé De Porta in 1962 and De Porta
Anodontites laciranus, Diplodon oponcintonis, Diplodon waringi, and Corbula sp., among other mollusks described by De Porta in 1966.

Regional correlations

See also 
 Geology of the Eastern Hills
 Geology of the Ocetá Páramo
 Geology of the Altiplano Cundiboyacense

Notes and references

Notes

References

Bibliography 
See also sources for the correlation table

Maps 
 
 
 
 

Geologic formations of Colombia
Paleogene Colombia
Oligocene Series of South America
Deseadan
Chattian Stage
Shale formations
Sandstone formations
Siltstone formations
Coal formations
Deltaic deposits
Lacustrine deposits
Fossiliferous stratigraphic units of South America
Formations
Formations